Jacob Lerche Johansen (1818–1900) was a Norwegian naval officer and politician. He was Minister of the Navy and Postal Affairs for several periods between 1872 and 1884, as well as member of the Council of State Division in Stockholm several times during the same period.

He was a brother of civil servant Jochum Johansen.

References

1818 births
1900 deaths
Government ministers of Norway
19th-century Norwegian politicians